Claude Nobs (February 4, 1936 – January 10, 2013) was the founder and general manager of the Montreux Jazz Festival.

Biography

Nobs was born in Montreux, Switzerland. After apprenticing as a cook, Nobs worked in the Tourism Office of Montreux. He later went to New York, where he met Nesuhi Ertegün, the then-president of Atlantic Records. He also met Roberta Flack and invited her to the Rose d’Or de Montreux. Later, Aretha Franklin made her first visit to Europe thanks to him.

At the age of 31, while he was director of the Tourism Office of Montreux, he organized the first jazz festival featuring artists such as Charles Lloyd, Keith Jarrett, Ron McLure and Jack DeJohnette. This new festival was an immediate success, and gained a reputation far beyond Switzerland. Nobs quickly transformed his festival into an international gathering place for lovers of jazz.

In 1971, Deep Purple decided to produce and record their album Machine Head in Montreux. The group was also scheduled to record at the Montreux Casino, shortly after Frank Zappa performed. During Zappa's concert, a member of the audience fired a flare gun towards the ceiling, resulting in a severe fire that reduced the Casino to ashes. Nobs saved several young people who had hidden in the casino, thinking they would be sheltered from the flames. Nobs, who had served as a volunteer fireman, knew that the casino was not actually a safe place and acted immediately to get them out. This act earned him a mention (in the line "Funky Claude was running in and out pulling kids out the ground") in the song "Smoke on the Water", which is about the incident. Also, on the inner liner of the original album, Nobs' picture was the only one labeled with a name other than those of the band members themselves.

In 1973, Nobs became the director of the Swiss branch of Warner, Elektra and Atlantic.  On the live Jethro Tull album Bursting Out (recorded on 28 May 1978 in Bern), one can hear Nobs announcing in Swiss German, "Gueten Abig mitenand, und herzlich willkommen in der Festhalle Bern!" ("Good evening everybody, and welcome to the Festhall of Bern").

During the 1990s, Nobs shared the directorship of the festival with Quincy Jones, and made Miles Davis an honorary host. The festival continued to diversify and was no longer exclusively devoted to jazz.

In 2004, the festival attracted 200,000 visitors. On 25 September 2004, Nobs received the Tourism Prize of Salz & Pfeffer. The canton of Vaud gave him the "Prix du Rayonnement" for his contributions to music. He has also received an honorary doctorate.

In 2005, during the referendum campaign on registered partnership in Switzerland for same-sex couples, Nobs came out publicly to support the new law. At the time, he had been in a relationship with his partner, Thierry Amsallem, since 1987.

On 24 December 2012, Nobs had an accident while Nordic skiing in Switzerland and fell into a coma. He died on 10 January 2013 at age 76.

References

External links 
Montreux Jazz Festival
 Claude Nobs Foundation
 Live at Montreux on YouTube
 Claude Nobs Revealed on CNN.com International

1936 births
2013 deaths
Skiing deaths
Swiss businesspeople
Festival directors
People from Montreux
Deep Purple
Accidental deaths in Switzerland
Swiss LGBT people